Peter Lurie is an American voice actor, sports anchor and television personality who has worked in television shows, movies, and dubbed anime, since the mid-1990s. He is most well known for his role as the voice of Vulcan Raven in the Metal Gear video game series, Marvel Comics supervillain Sabretooth and Paxton Fettel of F.E.A.R. series. He currently works as an HRTV, TVG Network anchor, and as an in-house host for Hoosier Park, and for Indiana Grand Racetrack as well.

Biography

1980s
Early in his career, Lurie worked as a tour guide at Universal Studios Hollywood. The owner of the recording studio heard Lurie giving a tour, and recommended he try out voice acting. Six months later, Lurie got his first job as a sound engineer for ABC's Wild World of Kids. During this time, he also continued to develop music with a band he co-founded called “Fourth Car Foreign”. The group existed for 10 years, but was not a commercial success.

1990s
Lurie was avid about horse racing, and started a horse racing venture with his ward and train Warren Sdut, dean of California Horse Racing, in the 1990's. The venture was moderately successful for approximately five years.

2000s
Lurie later began to work as a jockey's agent. While working in this capacity, he was offered a job by a new horse racing channel, HRTV.  Lurie has been part of the broadcast team since 2002. In addition to his HRTV success, Lurie had a successful voice-over career in the film industry, including his role in the Academy Award-winning animated short film The ChubbChubbs! by Sony Pictures ImageWorks. He has also worked as an in-house host for Indiana Grand Racetrack since 2015.

Filmography

Anime

 Arc the Lad – Alfred
 Bleach – Jidanbou Ikkanzaka, Jirōbō Ikkanzaka
 Sword of the Berserk - Zodd
 Code Geass – Viceroy Calares
 Dinozaurs – Misc.
 Fushigi Yugi – Additional voices
 Kikaider – Orange Ant
 Monster - Karl Lanke
 Naruto – Kidomaru, Tobirama Senju
 Naruto: Shippuden – Hashirama Senju, Young Danzo Shimura
 Nightwalker – Breed, Riho's Father
 Rave Master – King Gale Raregroove
 Rurouni Kenshin – Sobei Sumidaya
 The Big O – Dan Dastun
 Terraformars – Narrator, Jason Carlos Bourne
 Transformers: Robots in Disguise – Slapper
 Trigun – Additional voices
 Wolf's Rain – Chen

Animation

 American Dad! – Mysterious Man
 Black Panther – Juggernaut
 Brandy & Mr. Whiskers – Additional voices
 Crashbox – Jumpin' Johnny Jumble
 Jason and the Heroes of Mount Olympus – Additional voices
 Rocket Power – TV weather reporter (Ep. 5)
 Teenage Mutant Ninja Turtles – Leatherhead
 The Grim Adventures of Billy and Mandy – Additional voices
 Ultimate Spider-Man – Sabretooth, additional voices
 Wolverine and the X-Men – Sabretooth

Film
 Cowboy Bebop: The Movie – Spy C, ISSP Delta Squad 
 Street Fighter Alpha: The Animation – Professor Sadler
 The Little Polar Bear – Lemming #4

Video games

 Age of Mythology (Kamos the Minotaur)
 EverQuest II – Quartermaster Brennar, Golem, Zombie, Shadowman 
 Grim Fandango – Celso Flores, Slisko
 F.E.A.R. – Paxton Fettel
 F.E.A.R. Extraction Point – Paxton Fettel
 F.E.A.R. Perseus Mandate – Paxton Fettel, Nightcrawler Commander
 F.E.A.R. 2: Project Origin  – Replica Forces Commander
 F.E.A.R. 2: Reborn  – Paxton Fettel, Foxtrot 813
 F.E.A.R. 3 – Paxton Fettel
 Skylanders: Giants – Prism Break, additional voices
 Superman Returns – Riot

References

External links
 
 

1962 births
Living people
American racehorse owners and breeders
American male video game actors
American male voice actors
Male actors from Los Angeles
American horse racing commentators
American sports announcers
20th-century American male actors
21st-century American male actors